Charles Joseph Morrissy (January 18, 1881 – April 22, 1932) was an accountant and political figure in New Brunswick, Canada. He represented Northumberland County in the Legislative Assembly of New Brunswick from 1920 to 1925 and Northumberland in the House of Commons of Canada from 1926 to 1930 as a Liberal member.

He was born in Newcastle, New Brunswick, the son of John Morrissy and Joanna Dunn. Morrissy was educated in Newcastle and at Saint Francis Xavier College in Nova Scotia. In 1908, he married Ellen Catherine Hennessy. He served on the council for Newcastle from 1907 to 1911 and was mayor in 1913, 1914 and 1916.

References 
 
 Canadian Parliamentary Guide, 1922, EJ Chambers

1881 births
1932 deaths
New Brunswick Liberal Association MLAs
Members of the House of Commons of Canada from New Brunswick
Liberal Party of Canada MPs
Miramichi